Millport is an unincorporated community in Franklin Township, Columbiana County, Ohio, United States. It lies just north of the village of Summitville in the southwestern part of the county, at the intersection of Ohio State Route 644 and 518.

History
Millport was platted in 1853, and named for the sawmill and gristmill at the town site. A post office called Millport was established in 1861, and remained in operation until 1929.

References

Unincorporated communities in Columbiana County, Ohio
1853 establishments in Ohio
Populated places established in 1853
Unincorporated communities in Ohio